St Martin of Tours church, Epsom is a Grade II* listed building, number 1028592, in Church Street, Epsom, Surrey, KT17 4PX.

The flint tower dates from about 1450. The rest of the church was rebuilt in 1824 to designs by Mr Hatchard of Pimlico. In 1908 the choir and transepts were added by Sir Charles Nicholson. 

The organ is a fine three-manual Norman and Beard organ. There is a two-level reredos above the altar with small statues of saints.

There are war memorials for the men of St Martin's Epsom who died in the Great War and to those who died in the Burma Campaign, 1942–45. The graveyard contains some fine monuments.

Monuments
Several monuments from the old church survived and are now in the nave of the new church. They represent the following individuals:

See also
List of places of worship in Epsom and Ewell

References

External links
 
 

Epsom and Ewell
Church of England church buildings in Surrey
Diocese of Guildford